The 1990 Ole Miss Rebels football team represented the University of Mississippi in the 1990 NCAA Division I-A football season.

Schedule

Personnel

Season summary

vs Mississippi State

Attendance: 56,652 (largest crowd since 1983)

MSU: FG Joel Logan 40
UM: Luke 32 run (Lee kick)
MSU: Bouldin 37 pass from Shell (pass failed)
UM: Luke 4 run (Lee kick)

Rushing: MSU – Roberts 16–81, UM – Luke 18-136
Passing: MSU – Shell 16-31-145, UM – Luke 7-13-66
Receiving: MSU – Bouldin 2-44, UM – Owens 3-39

Fight broke out during the game following a punt
Last Egg Bowl played in Jackson, Mississippi

References

Ole Miss
Ole Miss Rebels football seasons
Ole Miss Rebels football